Lindera wrayi is a species of plant in the family Lauraceae. It is endemic to Peninsular Malaysia.

References

wrayi
Endemic flora of Peninsular Malaysia
Least concern plants
Taxonomy articles created by Polbot